Yugoslav studies or Yugoslavistics is an academic discipline within Slavic studies and historical studies which is concerned with the study of the XIX century or earlier origins of the Yugoslav idea, creation of Yugoslavia, history of the Kingdom of Yugoslavia, World War II in Yugoslavia, SFR Yugoslavia and breakup of Yugoslavia including Yugoslav Wars as well as the Yugoslavs either as an umbrella term or exclusive identification. In contemporary period the discipline is also focused on the post-Yugoslav remembrance of Yugoslavia. Historically, the term was also used as an umbrella term for Serbian, Croatian, Macedonian, Bosnian, Slovenian and Montenegrin studies. During the 1990s the discipline was closely intertwined with the field of security studies due to the conflicts in the region.

The collapse of the Yugoslav state in early 1990's brought the existence of the discipline into question with multiple institutions changing their names or closing down. The field needed to redefine its new position in relation to closely related South Slavic studies (which alongside post-Yugoslav space include Bulgaria as well) and Serbo-Croatian studies (further differentiated into Serbian, Croatian, Bosnian and Montenegrin studies). In his 1993 essay The Phantom of Yugoslavistics German Slavist  stated that the field was based on the historical coincidence of the existence of a Yugoslav state and on the “fading out of the Bulgarian components and interests" concluding that the South Slavic studies should take its place. The conflict in the area of former Yugoslavia nevertheless attracted significant academic attention with over 130 books being published on it and with multiple authors analyzing it in the framework of Yugoslav or Post-Yugoslav studies. Today the field is dealing with transdisciplinary analysis of various Yugoslav and post-Yugoslav phenomena, social relations and practices.

History
After her exile from South Africa AnnMarie Wolpe gained a post at the Department of Yugoslav Studies of the University of Bradford in 1963.

Prominent academics in the field
 Stevan K. Pavlowitch
 Sabrina P. Ramet
 Tanja Lucić
 Fred Singleton

Historical and contemporary institutions

Contemporary

Former Yugoslavia

 Museum of Yugoslavia
 Archives of Yugoslavia
 Yugoslav Film Archive
 Centre for Yugoslav Studies (CEJUS) at the Singidunum University

Elsewhere
 Fred Singleton Archive, University of Bradford
 International Association of South-East European Studies

Historical

Former Yugoslavia
 Yugoslav Academy of Sciences and Arts (today Croatian Academy of Sciences and Arts)
 Yugoslav Lexicographical Institute (today Miroslav Krleža Institute of Lexicography)
 Department of Yugoslavistics (University of Skopje)
 Department of Yugoslavistics (Faculty of Humanities and Social Sciences, University of Zagreb)
 Department of Yugoslavistics (University of Osijek)

Elsewhere
 University of Bradford Postgraduate School of Yugoslav Studies
 Department of Yugoslavistics (Charles University)
 Department of Yugoslavistics (Jagiellonian University)
 Department of Yugoslavistics (University of Bucharest)

See also
 Encyclopedia of Yugoslavia
 Balkan studies
 Ottoman studies
 Soviet and Communist studies

References

Further reading

External links
 YURG seminar: Heritage Scholars, Power, and Knowledge Production in (Post-)Yugoslav Studies (March 7, 2022), Central European University
 Yugoslav Studies platform, Department of Slavic Languages and Literatures of the University of Michigan
 Bosniak Institute Library Yugoslavistics Section. Bosniak Institute

Area studies by period
Slavic studies
Yugoslavism
Works about Yugoslavia
Yugoslav culture
History of Yugoslavia
Science and technology in Yugoslavia
Balkan studies
Cross-cultural studies
Cultural history of Bosnia and Herzegovina
Cultural history of Croatia
Cultural history of Kosovo
Cultural history of Montenegro
Cultural history of North Macedonia
Cultural history of Serbia
Cultural history of Slovenia